Straight from Paris is a 1921 American silent comedy film directed by Harry Garson and starring Clara Kimball Young, Bertram Grassby and Betty Francisco.

Cast
 Clara Kimball Young as 	Lucette Grenier
 Bertram Grassby as Robert Van Austen
 William P. Carleton as John Van Austen
 Betty Francisco as 	Doris Charming
 Thomas Jefferson as Henri Trevel
 Gerard Alexander as 	Mrs. Stevenson
 Clarissa Selwynne as Mrs. Van Austen

References

Bibliography
 Connelly, Robert B. The Silents: Silent Feature Films, 1910-36, Volume 40, Issue 2. December Press, 1998.
 Munden, Kenneth White. The American Film Institute Catalog of Motion Pictures Produced in the United States, Part 1. University of California Press, 1997.

External links
 

1921 films
1921 comedy films
1920s English-language films
American silent feature films
Silent American comedy films
American black-and-white films
Films directed by Harry Garson
1920s American films